The Belarus women's national volleyball team represented Belarus in international women's volleyball competitions and friendly matches. After the dissolution of the Soviet Union the team first competed on the highest level under its own flag at the 1993 European Championship, finishing in eighth place.

In light of the 2022 Russian invasion of Ukraine, the European Volleyball Confederation (CEV) banned all Belarusian national teams, clubs, and officials from participating in European competition, and suspended all members of Belarus from their respective functions in CEV organs.

European Championship record
 1993 — 8th place
 1995 — 8th place
 1997 — 9th place
 2007 — 16th place
 2009 — 14th place
 2013 — 12th place
 2015 — 9th place
 2017 — 7th place
 2019 — 22nd place
2021 — 14th place

References

External links
Official website
FIVB profile

National women's volleyball teams
Volleyball
Volleyball in Belarus